I'm Day Dreaming is a single by singer Redd, featuring American singer Akon and American rapper Snoop Dogg. The song was released in 2011. It is a remix of the DJ Drama song "Day Dreaming", which also features Akon and Snoop Dogg, along with an extra verse from T.I. This version does not include the latter's verse, but instead features a post-chorus from Redd.

Charts

References 

2011 singles
Akon songs
Snoop Dogg songs